Best Of is a compilation album by American band The Czars. It was released in December 2014 under Bella Union.

Track list

References

2014 compilation albums
Bella Union albums